Poland competed at the 1976 Summer Olympics in Montreal, Quebec, Canada. 207 competitors, 180 men and 27 women, took part in 116 events in 18 sports.

Medalists

Gold
 Irena Szewińska — Athletics, Women's 400 metres
 Jacek Wszola — Athletics, Men's High Jump
 Tadeusz Ślusarski — Athletics, Men's Pole Vault
 Jerzy Rybicki — Boxing, Men's Light-Middleweight (67–71 kg)
 Janusz Pyciak-Peciak — Modern Pentathlon, individual
 Włodzimierz Stefański, Bronislaw Bebel, Lech Łasko, Edward Skorek, Tomasz Wójtowicz, Wiesław Gawłowski, Mirosław Rybaczewski, Zbigniew Lubiejewski, Ryszard Bosek, Włodzimierz Sadalski, Zbigniew Zarzycki, Marek Karbarz, and Hubert Wagner (as coach); Volleyball, Men's Team Competition
 Kazimierz Lipień — Wrestling, Men's Greco-Roman (57–62 kg)

Silver
 Bronisław Malinowski — Athletics, Men's 3.000m Steeplechase
 Zbigniew Jaremski, Andrej Kupczyk, Ryszard Podlas, and Jan Werner — Athletics, 4 × 400 m relay men
 Tadeusz Mytnik, Mieczysław Nowicki, Stanisław Szozda, and Ryszard Szurkowski — Cycling Road, Men's Team Time Trial
 Andrzej Gronowicz and Jerzy Opara — Canoe / Kayak, Men's Flatwater C-2 500 m (canoe double)
 Jan Benigier, Lesław Ćmikiewicz, Kazimierz Deyna,  Jerzy Gorgoń, Henryk Kasperczak, Kazimierz Kmiecik, Grzegorz Lato, Zygmunt Maszczyk, Piotr Mowlik, Roman Ogaza, Wojciech Rudy, Andrzej Szarmach, Antoni Szymanowski, Jan Tomaszewski, Henryk Wawrowski, Henryk Wieczorek, and Władysław Żmuda — Football, Men's Team Competition
 Grzegorz Cziura — Weightlifting, Men's Bantamweight

Bronze
 Leszek Błażyński — Boxing, Men's Flyweight (48–51 kg)
 Leszek Kosedowski — Boxing, Men's Featherweight (54–57 kg)
 Kazimierz Szczerba — Boxing, Men's Light-Welterweight (60–63.5 kg)
 Janusz Gortat — Boxing, Men's Light-Heavyweight (75–81 kg)
 Mieczysław Nowicki — Cycling, Men's Individual Road Race
 Zdzisław Antczak, Janusz Brzozowski, Piotr Cieśla, Jan Gmyrek, Alfred Kałuziński, Jerzy Klempel, Zygfryd Kuchta, Jerzy Melcer, Ryszard Przybysz, Henryk Rozmiarek, Andrzej Sokołowski, Andrzej Szymczak, Mieczysław Wojczak, and Włodzimierz Zieliński — Handball, Men's Team Competition
 Marian Tałaj — Judo, Men's Half-Middleweight (63–70 kg)
 Wiesław Gawlikowski — Shooting, skeet (125 targets) Mixed
 Jerzy Greszkiewicz — Shooting, 50 m running target (30+30 shots) Mixed
 Kazimierz Czarnecki — Weightlifting, 60–67.5 kg, total (lightweight)
 Tadeusz Rutkowski — Weightlifting, 91–110 kg, total (heavyweight) Men
 Czesław Kwieciński — Wrestling Greco-Roman, 82–90 kg (light-heavyweight)
 Andrzej Skrzydlewski — Wrestling Greco-Roman, 90–100 kg (heavyweight)

Archery

Poland entered two women and two men in the archery competition.  It was the second time that Poland had sent archers to the Olympics.  After winning a silver medal in the women's competition in 1972, Poland's best finisher in 1976 was Jadwiga Wilejto at 6th place.  Both of the Polish men, however, improved considerably on the best male competitor of four years before.  Poland placed eighth on the national leaderboard for archery.

Men

Women

Athletics

Men
Track & road events

Field events

Combined events – Decathlon

Women
Track & road events

Field events

Results have been removed due to her disqualification for using anabolic steroids, the first case of such a disqualification in the sport at the Olympics.

Boxing

Men

Canoeing

Sprint
Men

Women

Cycling

Road

Track

1000m time trial

Men's Sprint

Pursuit

Fencing

18 fencers, 13 men and 5 women, represented Poland in 1976.

Men

Women

Football

First round

Group C

 **Ghana withdrew

Bracket

Quarter-finals

Semi-finals

Gold Medal match

Team roster
 –  Silver Medal

 Jan Tomaszewski
 Piotr Mowlik
 Antoni Szymanowski
 Jerzy Gorgoń
 Wojciech Rudy
 Władysław Żmuda

 Zygmunt Maszczyk
 Grzegorz Lato
 Henryk Wawrowski
 Henryk Kasperczak
 Roman Ogaza
 Kazimierz Kmiecik

 Kazimierz Deyna
 Andrzej Szarmach
 Henryk Wieczorek
 Leslaw Cmikiewicz
 Jan Benigier

Head coach
 Kazimierz Górski

Gymnastics

Artistic
Men

Individual finals

Handball

Preliminary round

Group B

Bronze medal match

Roster
 -  Bronze Medal

 Zdzisław Antczak
 Janusz Brzozowski
 Piotr Cieśla
 Jan Gmyrek
Alfred Kałuziński

 Jerzy Klempel
 Zygfryd Kuchta
 Jerzy Melcer
 Ryszard Przybysz
 Henryk Rozmiarek

 Mieczysław Wojczak
 Włodzimierz Zieliński
 Andrzej Sokołowski
 Andrzej Szymczak

Head coach
 Janusz Czerwiński

Judo

Men

Modern pentathlon

Three male pentathletes represented Poland in 1976. Janusz Pyciak-Peciak won an individual gold medal.

Rowing

Men

Women

Sailing

Open

Shooting

Open

Swimming

Men

Women

Volleyball

Preliminary round

Pool A 

|}

|}

1st–4th places

Semifinals 

|}

Gold medal match 

|}
 
Team roster
 -  Gold Medal

 Włodzimierz Stefański
 Bronislaw Bebel
 Lech Łasko
 Edward Skorek

 Tomasz Wójtowicz
 Wiesław Gawłowski
 Mirosław Rybaczewski
 Zbigniew Lubiejewski

 Ryszard Bosek
 Włodzimierz Sadalski
 Zbigniew Zarzycki
 Marek Karbarz

Head coach
 Hubert Wagner

Weightlifting

Men

Wrestling

Men's freestyle

Men's Greco-Roman

References

Nations at the 1976 Summer Olympics
1976 Summer Olympics
1976 in Polish sport